Simhah Reuben Edelmann (born in Wilna January 1821; died in Warsaw December 1892 - pen name: Sar-Shalom Ha'adulami) was a Russian grammarian and commentator. He received a good Talmudical education at home and later at the yeshivah of Volozhin. He lived in Rossein for about thirty years, mainly in the employ of a rich merchant of the name of Gabrilovitch, but for a part of the time in business for himself. Edelmann was the first to discover the latent talent of the poet Judah Loeb Gordon, for whom he obtained a position as teacher in Gabrilovitch's house. After the death of his wife Edelmann left Rossein and lived for a short time in Tels (1867). Later he was employed successively in Mohilev and Königsberg. In his later days he was again in business for himself, first in Brest and then in Kovno, and at last settled in Warsaw, the home of his surviving children, where he died.

Edelmann was the author of the following works: "Shoshannim," containing, besides some treatises on grammar and exegesis, a few poems, and a commentary on Canticles, Königsberg, 1860; "Ha-Mesillot," in three parts, of which the first treats of the Masoretic text of the Bible and of the changed readings occurring in the Bible quotations of the Talmud;the second is a quasi-critical commentary on Psalms lxviii., xc., and c., and the third contains commentaries and explanations on various difficult passages of the Haggadah, Wilna, 1875; "Ha-Tirosh," a commentary on Midrash Rabbah, part 1, Genesis, Warsaw, 1891; and "Doresh Reshumot" (a scathing criticism of the liberal views advanced by Weiss in "Dor"), ib. 1892. He also contributed valuable articles to Fuenn's "Ha-Karmel" and Atlas' "Ha-Kerem."

Edelmann was considered one of the foremost champions of Orthodoxy in modern Hebrew literature.

Jewish Encyclopedia bibliography
Ḥakam we-Dor, a biography of S. R. Edelmann by his son Mordecai Isaac, Warsaw, 1885 (Hebrew);
Zeitlin, Bibl. Post-Mendels.L. G

References

1821 births
1892 deaths